Lanitz may refer to:

Lanitz Aviation, a German aircraft manufacturer, based in Leipzig
Lanitz-Hassel-Tal, a municipality in the Burgenlandkreis district of Saxony-Anhalt, Germany